Alex Riel (born 13 September 1940) is a Danish jazz and rock drummer. His first group Alex Riel/Palle Mikkelborg Quintet won Montreux Grand Prix Award at the Montreux Jazz Festival in 1968 and it was published in Billboard's June 1968 edition. He is married to the writer Ane Riel.

Biography
Riel has recorded with, among others, Kenny Drew, Kenny Werner, Bob Brookmeyer, Thomas Clausen, Bill Evans, Eddie "Lockjaw" Davis, Jackie McLean, and Dexter Gordon. He has also worked with a wide range of important jazz musicians, including Ray Brown, Donald Byrd, Don Cherry, Art Farmer, Stéphane Grappelli, Hank Jones, Thad Jones, and Ben Webster. He formed a renowned jazz ensemble with bass player Niels-Henning Ørsted Pedersen and Kenny Drew.

He was also a founding member in 1968 of the Danish rock group The Savage Rose. His album The Riel Deal won a Danish Grammy Award Jazz in 1996.

In September 2010, Riel reached seventy years of an age and it was celebrated at the famed Jazzhus Montmartre. The event was broadcast live with the title Celebration of a Living Jazz Legend by the Danish national television station TV2 which was also showing rare photos depicting Riel with Duke Ellington, Ben Webster, Bill Evans and The Savage Rose.

Personal life
Alex Riel married Ane Riel in 2002, an awarded author of crime fiction. They have lived in Liseleje in North Zealand since 2005.

Awards
Danish Jazz Musician Award 1965 presented by Duke Ellington and Sam Woodyard (Photo)
Ben Webster 90 Years Honorary Prize 1999 (shared with Niels-Henning Ørsted Pedersen and Olivier Antunes)
Danish Grammy Award Jazz in 1996 for Riel's album The Riel Deal
Life Time Achievement Award from IFPI 2007 (Photo)

Discography

As leader
 Alex Riel Trio with Kenny Drew, Niels-Henning Ørsted Pedersen (Fona, 1965)
 Emergence with Jesper Lundgaard, Jerry Bergonzi (Red, 1994)
 The Riel Deal with Kenny Werner, Jerry Bergonzi (Stunt, 1996) 
 Unriel with Jerry Bergonzi, Michael Brecker, Eddie Gómez, Mike Stern, Niels Lan Doky (Stunt, 1997)
 DSB Kino with Harry Sweets Edison, Roger Kellaway (Stunt, 1998) 
 Rielatin with Jerry Bergonzi, Mike Stern, Kenny Werner (Stunt, 1999)
 Celebration  (Stunt, 2000)
 Live at Jive Alex Riel/Luts Büchner Quartet (Stunt, 2001)
 What Happened? Alex Riel Trio (Cowbell, 2004)
 The High & The Mighty Alex Riel Trio (Cowbell, 2007)
 Live at Stars Alex Riel Quartet feat. Charlie Mariano (Cowbell, 2008)
 Riel Time Alex Riel Quartet (Cowbell, 2008)
 Get Riel  (Cowbell, 2008)

As sideman
With Eddie "Lockjaw" Davis
 Swingin' Till the Girls Come Home (SteepleChase, 1976)

With Dexter Gordon
 Cheese Cake (SteepleChase, 1964 [1979])
 King Neptune (SteepleChase, 1964 [1979])
 Love for Sale (SteepleChase, 1964 [1982])
 It's You or No One (SteepleChase, 1964 [1983])
 Billie's Bounce (SteepleChase, 1964 [1983])
 Loose Walk (SteepleChase 1965 [2003])
 Misty (SteepleChase, 1965 [2004])
 Heartaches (SteepleChase, 1965 [2004])
 Ladybird (SteepleChase, 1965 [2005])
 More Than You Know (SteepleChase, 1975)
 Swiss Nights Vol. 1 (SteepleChase, 1975 [1976])
 Swiss Nights Vol. 2 (SteepleChase, 1975 [1978])
 Swiss Nights Vol. 3 (SteepleChase, 1975 [1979])
 Lullaby for a Monster (SteepleChase, 1976 [1981])

With Bob Brookmeyer
 Holiday (Challenge, 1981)

With Ken McIntyre
 Hindsight (SteepleChase, 1974)

With Jackie McLean
 Live at Montmartre (SteepleChase, 1972)
 Ode to Super (SteepleChase, 1973) with Gary Bartz
 A Ghetto Lullaby (SteepleChase, 1974)
 The Meeting (SteepleChase, 1974) with Dexter Gordon
 The Source (SteepleChase, 1974) with Dexter Gordon

With Archie Shepp and Lars Gullin
 The House I Live In (SteepleChase, 1963 [1980])

With Sahib Shihab
 Sahib's Jazz Party (Debut, 1963)

With Thorgeir Stubø
 Flight (Hot Club, 1985)

With Radka Toneff
 Live in Hamburg (Odin, 1981)
 Butterfly, track 4-6 (Curling Legs, 2008)

With Ben Webster
 My Man: Live at Montmartre 1973 (SteepleChase, 1973)

Gallery

References

External links
 Official site

1940 births
Living people
Hard bop drummers
Danish rock drummers
Danish jazz drummers
Musicians from Copenhagen
People from Halsnæs Municipality